Dosang is a rural locality (a settlement) in Akhtubinsky Selsoviet, Krasnoyarsky District, Astrakhan Oblast, Russia. The population was 734 as of 2010. There are 5 streets.

Geography 
Dosang is located 59 km north of Krasny Yar (the district's administrative centre) by road. Topal is the nearest rural locality.

References 

Rural localities in Krasnoyarsky District, Astrakhan Oblast